John Henry Dunsford (3 July 1855 – 15 September 1905) was a miner and member of the Queensland Legislative Assembly.

Early days
Dunsford was born in Maldon, Victoria, to parents John Holman Dunsford and his wife Mary (née Harding). and educated at Maldon State School. By 1873 he was in Queensland and getting pastoral experience and in 1876 he headed overseas to work as a goldminer in Madagascar and South Africa.

By 1878 he was back in Australia and working in Charters Towers as a stationer and finally in 1892 he went back to mining for a year, speculating on the goldfields in the area.

Political career
After spending time as a councilor at Charters Towers, Dunsford, standing for the Labour Party, won the seat of Charters Towers in the Queensland Legislative Assembly. He held the seat for over twelve years until his death in 1905.

Personal life
On the 9 Mar 1882 Dunsford married Maria McDonough and together had five children. He died in office in 1905 and was buried in the Cunnamulla Cemetery.

References

Members of the Queensland Legislative Assembly
1855 births
1905 deaths
19th-century Australian politicians
People from Maldon, Victoria